Superstox is a type of single seat formula racing, similar to Sprint car racing developed in the 1960s in the United Kingdom. Racing is 'contact' whereby drivers can use the front bumper to help dislodge any car in front.  Like most other forms of short oval racing, the higher rated drivers normally start at the back of the grid for each race.

Its original roots come from the mid-1950s, it derived as a cheaper alternative to BriSCA Formula One Stock Car Racing, where a smaller junior formula was raced nationally before the Southern 'Spedeworth' short oval tracks broke away from the main promoting body in 1961 to run their own version of Juniors which they called Formula Two. The cars were originally standard or 'stock' but became more modified over the years until 1968 when a new 'stock' car formula was introduced and the original much modified class became known as Super Stock Cars. This was later shortened to Superstox.
Today the class bears no resemblance to a road going car. Chassis are generally built by specialist companies and all the components are special racing ones. The cars are all of front engine design although rear engine was allowed up until the mid-1970s.

Previous famous drivers include 1973 World Champion Derek Warwick and British Champion, Paul Warwick.

World Championship
First raced at Ipswich in 1961 before moving to its longtime home at Wimbledon Stadium. The 1962 World Championship was actually the first car meeting held at Wimbledon. The race originally was a World title in name only although it was an English domiciled Czech, Jan Scott, who won the first running.  Later in the sixties the event attracted Spedeworth's Scottish drivers and then the European competitors (the Netherlands, Germany and Belgium) from the NACO organisation. The first European cars to race in the UK were different specifications to the UK counterparts - the 1966 Dutch team having V8 powered saloon cars. A stronger affiliation in the early 1970s saw the European drivers racing rear engine cars although this type of machine proved less robust than a "Super Stock Car" and they become Midgets (non contact short oval racing cars) leaving the newer front engine cars that were appearing on the continent as Superstox.  The Superstox formula remained essentially a European one until the appearance of some South African drivers in the late 1960s when Spedeworth gained an affiliation there. The South Africans only contested the championship until the mid 1970s as there was no longer an equivalent class there.  One American driver, Al Contreras, represented the USA in the early 70s but he, like the inaugural champion, Scott was serving as an airman in this country at the time.
The Scottish Superstox died out in the 1980s when Gordon McDougall started his own promotion, breaking away from Spedeworth and affiliating to BriSCA.  The Scottish were represented in the title again in 2011 when the class started up again north of the border.

European Championship
Second to the World Championship in status of the races held for this formula, the European was, in the early seasons, the highest status race to be staged outside of the Spedeworth promotion's home circuits.  The European Championship has a remarkable history with its first runnings at Baarlo in the Netherlands.

1966 National Team League
Spedeworth set up a National Team League comprising six teams based at seven stadia. The first match took place at Aldershot on 21 May 1966 when the Knights beat the visiting Ipswich team.

Aldershot Knights
Managed by Frank Howlett

Eastbourne Eagles
Managed by Charlie Dugard.

Ipswich Witches
Managed by Pop Perry

London Sparrows
The team's home fixtures were shared between Wimbledon and New Cross Stadia

Yarmouth Bloaters
Managed by Ted Payne

Chichester
The team that never was. The team is referred to in texts from the period with top driver Don Mason mentioned as a driver. The team would most likely have used either Aldershot or Eastbourne as its base but no fixtures were contested by the team.

1971 & 1972 Auto Spedeway Team League
The Auto Spedeway team league was set up by Stock Car promoter Spedeworth International for the 1971 season. The competition only lasted just under two years. The racing featured the promotion's regular Superstox cars with identical bodies although underneath the chassis often varied. The body style was based on those sported by the touring South African Team in the 1970 season.

The prototype car was displayed on Spedeworth's stand at the 1971 Racing Car Show. The season was structured so that all the teams had two matches against each other, one home and one away.  Outside the League competition there were also a couple of multi-team tournament meetings.

The 1972 fixture schedule was not completed due to some driving standards problems and also the closure of Cross in Hand raceway in August that year.  
Each team was managed by a key person from the within the Spedeworth organisation and the team line ups included most of the top drivers from the era.
Despite the closure of Cross in Hand, Spedeworth later staged two friendly matches (in 1972 and 1973) at Aldershot between the Aldershot Knights and the Cross in Hand Tigers.

Aldershot Knights
Team Manager: Ted Weaver
Drivers: Denny Pearson (captain), Derry Warwick, Roy Wood, Stan Warwick, Ken Etwell, John Field
The Knights were based at Aldershot Stadium in Tongham.

Cross in Hand Tigers
Team Manager: Les Eaton
Drivers: Dave Pierce (captain), Dave Hindle, Alan Cox, Biffo Sweeney, Art Fowler, Gordon Street.

The Tigers were based at Cross-in-Hand raceway in Sussex

Eastbourne Lions
Team Manager: Ken Denham
Drivers: Chris Denham, Barry Kelleher, Rod Waller, Jim Stuart, Nigel Fox, Graham Minchin
The Lions joined the league in 1972 and were based at Arlington Stadium, near Eastbourne - the team effectively the old White City / Walthamstow outfit relocating.

Ipswich Foxes
Team Manager: Harry Barnes
Drivers: Skid Parish (captain), Tony Grant, Norman Crowe, Mike Read, John Biddle, Alan Cayzer. Reserve: Paul Rookyard

Ringwood Badgers
Team Manager: Alan Butler
Drivers: John Edwards (Captain), Tom Edwards, Cliff Maidment, Gordon Maidment, Derek Warwick, Roy Eaton
The Badgers joined the league in 1972 and were based at Matchams Park although they only ever hosted one home match (due to the demise of the league mid season) which was against the Wimbledon Dons.

Walthamstow (formerly White City) Lions
Team Manager: Roger Fennings
Drivers: 1971: Chris Denham (captain), Barry Kelleher, Jack Percy, Rod Waller, Jim Stuart, Les Holland. Occasional - Leon Smith
The team was originally going to be called the 'White City Slickers'. Neither White City nor Walthamstow were allocated a team for the 1972 season, the driver line up transferred to Eastbourne (Arlington Stadium) for the 1972 campaign.

Wimbledon Canaries / Dons
Team Manager: Reg Etherington
Drivers: 1971: Eric Taylor, Bryan Kensett (Captain), Tony Mellish, Frank Boyles, John Field, Keith Fransella 
1972: Jim Davey (Captain), Frank Boyles, Barry Plummer, Pete Welland, Bryan Kensett, Steve Monk, Keith Fransella, Reserve: Eric Taylor
Based at the Wimbledon Stadium in Plough Lane, the team were originally known as the Canaries but changed their name to the Dons for the 1972 season.

Wisbech Fen Tigers
Team Manager: Jack Gray

Drivers: Roger Warnes (captain), John Gray, Rick Drewery, Tony May (1972), Stu Blyth, Jack Savage. Reserves: Trevor Blyth, Malcolm Burrell

The Fen Tigers were the inaugural champions in 1971.

Yarmouth Greyhounds
Team Manager: Ted Payne
Drivers: 1971: Joe Cracknell, Horry Barnes, Colin Byrne, Trevor Blyth, Alan Taylor, Doug McMahon 
1972: Doug McMahon (captain), Alan Taylor, Bob Perry, Brian Randall, Pete Marshall, Doug Wardropper

Corgi Toys
Toy manufacturer Corgi produced and sold die-cast models of two major championship winning cars in their 'Corgi Rockets' range.  The cars were those of four times British Champion Derek Fiske and 1967 World Champion Adrian 'Todd' Sweeney. These were a good choice to represent the formula as Sweeney's car still had a cut down stock body (from a Renault 4CV) whilst Fiske's was one of the newer home made cabs not derived from a road car.

The cars were sold individually and in varying sets which also included tow cars, trailer and a Jaguar Pace Car.  The cars were launched in the 1970 season.  The Todd Sweeney shell was later re-used by Corgi as a generic silver liveried "Superstock" car.

References

External links
 Superstox website

Formula racing
Stock car racing in the United Kingdom